Psychrobacter namhaensis is a Gram-negative, aerobic, non-spore-forming, slightly halophilic bacterium of the genus Psychrobacter, which was isolated from the South Sea in Korea.

References

External links
Type strain of Psychrobacter namhaensis at BacDive -  the Bacterial Diversity Metadatabase

Moraxellaceae